John Patterson MacLean (March 12, 1848 – August 12, 1939) was an American Universalist minister and archaeologist and historian. While at Ohio State University he became a historian of the Shakers.

Biography
He was born on March 12, 1848, in Franklin, Ohio.

In 1864 at age sixteen he entered the National Normal University in Lebanon, Ohio. In 1867 he started at the Theological School of St. Lawrence University in Canton, New York, and he qualified for the ministry in 1869.

In 1887 he went to  the Island of Mull in Scotland to collect material for his "History of the Macleans."

He received his Ph.D. in 1894.

He died on August 12, 1939, in Greenville, Ohio, and was buried in Franklin, Ohio.

Publications
Scotland
A history of the clan MacLean from its first settlement at Duard Castle (1889)
Renaissance of the clan MacLean (1913)
An Historical Account of The Settlements of Scotch Highlanders in America Prior to the Peace of 1783

Religion
A sketch of the life and labors of Richard McNemar (1905)

Shakers
A concise history of the United Society of Believers called Shakers (1893)
Shakers of Ohio: fugitive papers concerning the Shakers of Ohio, with unpublished manuscripts (1907)
A Bibliography of Shaker Literature

Archaeology
A Manual of the Antiquity of Man (1877)
The Mound Builders (1879)
Mastodon, Mammoth and Man (1880)
An historical, archaeological and geological examination of Fingal's Cave in the island of Staffa (1890)
The Archaeological Collection of the Western Reserve Historical Society (1901)
A Critical Examination of the Evidences Adduced to Establish the Theory of the Norse Discovery

References

External links
 
 

 Shaker Collection: Shaker Literature donated by J. P. MacLean, available in the Rare Book and Special Collections Division at the Library of Congress

1848 births
1939 deaths
John Patterson
Theological School of St. Lawrence University alumni